Eastchester High School is located in Westchester County, New York in the town of Eastchester. A part of the Eastchester Union Free School District, it is a former U.S. Department of Education Blue Ribbon school   with approximately 1009 students. Graduates have gained acceptance to schools such as Bucknell University, Johns Hopkins University, UCLA, UC Berkeley, Georgia Tech, Princeton University, University of Pennsylvania, University of Chicago, Cornell University, Notre Dame, University of Virginia, University of Miami, Tulane University, Haverford College, Harvard University, Union College, and Stanford University. Eastchester High School is accredited by the New York State Board of Regents and the Middle States Association of Colleges and Schools.

History

Original Buildings
A junior high school was added to the High School in 1955, and two years later another wing was constructed to make up what is now known as Eastchester Middle School. The original gym and an auditorium were built at the High School in 1932, and a second gym was opened there in 1985.

Expansion
Eastchester High School received a major infrastructure overhaul with the passage of a $27 million-dollar bond vote in 2015. Among the additions were a new STEM wing, two computer labs, and an expanded cafeteria to reduce congestion of the rapidly growing student body.

Academics
Eastchester offers 18 AP classes as well as several courses for college credit in conjunction with colleges in New York State. Students who graduate from Eastchester Senior High School graduate with a New York State Regents Diploma. A student must pass 4 New York State Regents Exams to be eligible to graduate from Eastchester Senior High School. The 4 Regents Exams must be 1 in English Language Arts, 1 in Mathematics, 1 in Science, and 1 in Social Studies. A student must also pass 1 pathway. Upon successful passing of the 4 Regents Exams, 1 pathway, and 22 credit units a student is eligible for a Regents or Local Diploma. Alternative pathways are allowed but they must be pre-approved.

Grades 
Eastchester Senior High School is for students who are in 9th, 10th, 11th, or 12th grade and is the only high school apart of the Eastchester Union Free School District. The high school is connected to the middle school which hosts students in grades 6 through 8.

Subjects Offered 

 Mathematics
 English Language Arts
 Science
 History
 Music
 Film
 Health
 Physical Education
 Art
 World Languages

A full list of courses offered at Eastchester Senior High School can be found at this course catalog.

Athletics
Eastchester High School offers a number of varsity sports team competing in New York State's Section 1 including football, soccer, baseball, softball, basketball, track and field, volleyball, tennis, hockey swimming, cross-country, lacrosse, and wrestling.

Eastchester's athletes have achieved considerable success. Eastchester's girls tennis team captured the New York State singles title in 2002 and 2004.  Eastchester's Varsity Softball Team won New York State Championships in 1990 and 1991, with their head coach, Thomas "Skip" Walsh, First Base/Pitcher, Bonnie Bell (Shelton), and Pitcher Jennifer Satriale (Weitman), all subsequently inducted into the New York State High School Softball Hall of Fame.

Notable players

 John Doherty - MLB Pitcher, Detroit Tigers and Boston Red Sox, EHS Class of 1985.

Notable coaches

Ron Rothstein – Coach of the several NBA teams was both a physical education teacher and the varsity basketball coach in the late 1970s and early 1980s.

Notable alumni

Betty Broderick, High-profile murderer convicted of the killing of her ex-husband and his new wife in 1989, Class of 1965.
Doug Crane, Animator, Class of 1953.
Jimmy Fink, New York radio personality, Class of 1967.
Bobby Moynihan, Cast Member of Saturday Night Live, Class of 1995.
Eric Naposki, Former NFL player, convicted of murder, Class of 1984.
Kenneth Posner, Tony Award-winning Lighting Designer, Class of 1983.
Jill Cornell Tarter, Astronomer, Class of 1961.
Chuck Traynor, Pornographer, Class of 1955.
Ereka Vetrini, Reality TV Star & TV Host, Class of 1994.

References

External links

Eastchester, New York
Public high schools in Westchester County, New York
Educational institutions established in 1927
1927 establishments in New York (state)